Mimi Marks (born February 11, 1967) is an American entertainer.

Early life
Mimi was born in Waterloo, Iowa, but grew up in Oelwein, Iowa. As a child, she recalls feeling "uncomfortable in her body," and had the "most difficult time" in her physical education class because, she says, "I didn't fit in at all."

Later life
After undergoing some surgery for sex reassignment (due to stipulations in employment contracts, Marks has not had complete sex reassignment), Marks became Mimi. According to Trantasia, a transgender beauty pageant documentary, she has lived as a woman since she was 21 years old. Marks started performing in Milwaukee at a club called Dance, Dance, Dance with help from an Australian performer, Holly Brown. Marks says that, for trans women in Chicago, the test of whether they can pass as women is to appear in public at Wrigley Field, home of the Chicago Cubs: "If you could walk through Wrigley-ville, like, during a Cubs game and not get 'spooked,' and not have anybody call you out, you were like the 'girl-iest' girl, you made it. I called [a friend] and said, 'I am at a Cubs game on first base, eleventh row. I made it. I'm a girl!

In 1986, Marks won her first pageant title: Ms. Waterloo 1986. She has also won Miss International Queen, Pattaya, Thailand; The World's Most Beautiful Transsexual Contest, Las Vegas, Nevada, US; and Miss Continental, Chicago, Illinois, US.

In 2008 Marks appeared in Janet Jackson's music video "Rock With U".

Marks is reported to have been the first ever openly transgender runway model, working for the Ford Modeling agency.

She performed at The Baton Show Lounge in Chicago, Illinois, until retiring from the stage in January 2016.

References

External links 
 Article, Interview & Photos
 Official site of Trantasia: The Movie
 Windy City Times interview
 Mimi marks Profile on TGlife with Brianna Austin interview

1967 births
Living people
American beauty pageant winners
Transgender women
Transgender entertainers
People from Waterloo, Iowa
People from Oelwein, Iowa
LGBT people from Iowa
Miss International Queen winners